Retinia is a genus of moths belonging to the subfamily Olethreutinae of the family Tortricidae.

Species
Retinia albicapitana (Busck, 1914)
Retinia arizonensis (Heinrich, 1920)
Retinia burkeana (Kearfott, 1907)
Retinia coeruleostriana (Caradja, 1939)
Retinia comstockiana Fernald, 1879
Retinia cristata (Walsingham, 1900)
Retinia edemoidana (Dyar, 1903)
Retinia gemistrigulana (Kearfott, 1905)
Retinia houseri (Miller, 1959)
Retinia immanitana (Kuznetzov, 1969)
Retinia impropria (Meyrick, 1932)
Retinia jezoensis Nasu, 1991
Retinia khasiensis (Miller, 1977)
Retinia lemniscata (Kuznetzov, 1973)
Retinia mafica (Miller, 1978)
Retinia mecynopus Diakonoff, 1989
Retinia metallica (Busck, 1914)
Retinia monopunctata (Oku, 1968)
Retinia pallipennis (McDunnough, 1938)
Retinia picicolana (Dyar, 1906)
Retinia pseudotsugaicola Liu & Wu, 2001
Retinia resinella (Linnaeus, 1758)
Retinia sabiniana (Kearfott, 1907)
Retinia salweenensis (Miller, 1977)
Retinia scalaris (Diakonoff, 1968)
Retinia taedana (Miller, 1978)
Retinia teleopa (Meyrick, 1927)
Retinia virginiana (Busck, 1914)

See also
List of Tortricidae genera

References

External links
Tortricid.net

Eucosmini
Tortricidae genera
Taxa named by Achille Guenée